Usmanu Danfodiyo University, Sokoto (UDUS), also known as UDUSOK, is a public research university located in the city of Sokoto, north western Part of Nigeria. It is one of the initial twelve universities founded in Nigeria by the federal government in 1975.

Usmanu Danfodiyo University Sokoto with a motto "ikraa" which means "Read". The Degree is awarded base on character and learning 

The university is named after the famous Usman dan Fodio, the founder of the Sokoto Caliphate.

Academics
Udusok is a four, five and six-years degree-awarding institution that also runs associate degrees and remedial programmes. The university has a standard medical program and University Teaching Hospital. The university is divided into three campuses.

The main campus houses faculties of Agriculture, Arts & Languages, Education, Engineering, Law, Sciences, social sciences, Center for peace studies and Center for Energy research and training. The university senate, the main library complex (Abdullahi Fodiyo Library Complex) and the School of Postgraduate Studies are also located at the main campus with over 4500 seating capacity and information resources both online and offline data bases. the present university librarian is Dr. A.K. Nuhu.

The annex campus hosts the Veterinary Teaching Hospital with the faculty of Veterinary medicine and its teaching hospital, the Centre for Islamic Studies and the school of remedial program (school of matriculation studies).

A third campus houses the university's teaching hospital, faculty of Pharmaceutical Sciences, college of Health Sciences and faculty of Medical Laboratory Science.

Faculties
The university has twelve faculties:
 Faculty of Agriculture
 Faculty of Arts and Islamic Studies
 Faculty of Education and Extension Service
 Faculty of Engineering and Environmental Design
 College of Health Science
 Faculty of Law
 Faculty of Management Sciences
 Faculty of Pharmaceutical Sciences
 Faculty of Sciences
 Faculty of Social Sciences
 Faculty of Veterinary Medicine
 School of Medical Laboratory Sciences

Administration
A chancellor is a ceremonial head of Usmanu Danfodiyo University, while the vice-chancellor is the chief executive officer and Chief academic officer. The vice-chancellor is usually appointed for a period of five-year, non-renewable term. The current vice-chancellor, is  Professor Suleiman Lawal Bilbis. In Usman Danfodiyo University a young Nigerian lady recently made history as she became the first female president of the Student Union Government (SUG) body in a tertiary institution situated in the northern region of the country (Nigeria) According to reports by WomenAfrica.com, the student identified as Amina Yahaya emerged as the president of the students union body in the Usman Danfodiyo University, Sokoto, this makes her the first female to achieve the feat in over three decades. Yahaya had previously occupied the office of the vice-president of the sug, before the president was removed.

Notable administrators
Tijjani Muhammad-Bande
Lawal Bilbis

Holders of Honorary Degree
Alh. Aminu Dantata-Business Mogul and Philanthropist
Alh. Aliko Dangote- Business Mogul
Alh. Bola Tinubu- Politician and Former Governor Of Lagos State
Alh. Attahiru Bafarawa- Politician and Former Governor of Sokoto State

Notable alumni

 Atiku Bagudu, Current Governor of Kebbi State
 Abubakar Malami (SAN), lawyer, senior advocate of Nigeria, politician and Nigeria's current attorney general and Minister of Justice
 Abba Sayyadi Ruma, a former Federal Ministry of Agriculture and Rural Development in the late president Umar Musa Yaradua's Government
 Abdulmumini Kabir Usman, the current Emir of Katsina, Katsina State
 Aminu Abdullahi Shagali, politician and businessman and Former speaker Kaduna State House of Assembly.
 Aminu Tambuwal, former Speaker of the House of Representatives and the current Governor of Sokoto State
 Isatou Touray, politician, activist, and social reformer. Former Gambian Minister of Trade in the Barrow's cabinet and the current Minister of Health and Social Welfare.
 Mahmood Yakubu, professor, Chairman of the Nigeria's Independent National Electoral Commission
 Abdulrasheed Bawa, Economist and Detective. Current Chairman Nigeria's Economic and Financial Crimes Commission
 Mohammed Hassan Abdullahi, is a Nigerian lawyer and politician. He is Nigeria's current Minister of State Science and Technology

Stakeholders
TETFund
 Federal Ministry of Education
National Universities Commission

See also
 List of universities in Nigeria

References

External links 
 Usmanu Danfodiyo University, Sokoto website
 Fact-Check: Is UDUSOK the third Nigerian University verified by Facebook?

 
Educational institutions established in 1975
Universities and colleges in Nigeria
Public universities in Nigeria
Sokoto State
1975 establishments in Nigeria